Gordon John Buchanan  (born 10 April 1972) is a Scottish wildlife filmmaker and presenter. His work includes the nature documentaries Tribes, Predators & Me, The Polar Bear Family & Me and Life in the Snow.

Early life
Buchanan was born in Alexandria, West Dunbartonshire, Scotland, on 10 April 1972 and brought up on the Isle of Mull. As a child, Buchanan was a fan of David Attenborough's television programmes and Survival, a nature programme.

Career

Buchanan's career in wildlife photography has yielded a number of documentaries, shot variously in Asia (especially the Indian Subcontinent), Latin America, Europe and Africa.  His career began when survival cameraman Nick Gordon, whose wife owned the restaurant Buchanan was working in, invited Buchanan to become his camera assistant for a project he was completing in Sierra Leone. Buchanan was there for almost a year before the project had to be abandoned due to the danger presented by the civil unrest in the country. He left school to join Nick Gordon on this trip and continued to work with him on his next projects in Venezuela and Brazil.

Buchanan began to work independently in 1995, and in time became known for his films of big cats and worked on Big Cat Diary. He also returned to his home on the Isle of Mull to film white tailed eagles. The resulting 2005 Natural World episode, "Eagle Island", received good reviews. (It was broadcast on 3 May 2009 as "Eagles of Mull" on Nature.) He also filmed the Natural World episode "Leopards of Yala".

Buchanan has filmed foxes for Springwatch and Autumnwatch in Glasgow, where he currently lives. His coverage of grey seal pups was identified as one of the highlights of the programme. He then returned for Springwatch 2008 completing a series on people with amazing wildlife stories including a one-off Springwatch special. In Autumnwatch 2008 he travelled to the Farne Islands to film grey seal pups again. In early 2009 Buchanan worked with the BBC, filming the Lost Land of the Volcano. Filming took place during the month of February 2009, around Papua New Guinea, and its islands. He also filmed the Lost Land of the Tiger and Lost Land of the Jaguar, which followed a similar format.

In December 2010, a documentary called The Bear Family and Me aired on the BBC. It showed the year which Buchanan spent with black bears in the U.S. state of Minnesota. In January 2013, Buchanan presented and partially filmed The Polar Bear Family & Me for the BBC, covering the life of a polar bear and her cubs in the spring, summer and autumn.

In 2013 Buchanan became a patron of Trees for Life, a conservation charity working to restore the Caledonian Forest in the Highlands of Scotland. He became an ambassador for the Scottish Wildlife Trust the following year.

In December 2014, another '...& Me' 2-part series was broadcast on BBC Two. For this series, The Snow Wolf Family & Me, Buchanan visited Ellesmere Island in Canada in both summer and autumn. Here he followed a wolf pack as they raised their cubs over the course of a year. This was shortly followed, in February 2015, by Super Cute Animals, a 60-minute documentary.

In 2015, he presented the documentary Leopard in the City at Sanjay Gandhi National Park in the Borivli section of northern Mumbai in India, on the "urban leopards" of the area, which prey almost entirely on stray dogs. He also continued to film his ‘…And Me’ series, this time focusing on Gorillas, which was again broadcast on the BBC.

2016 saw him appear in ‘Elephant Family and Me’ where he visited Africa to get a better understanding of how a family of elephants live and communicate with each other. He also narrated a one-off programme called Life in the Snow, before again working with Polar Bears, this time looking at how they interact with the local human population in ‘Life in Polar Bear Town’.

From 2016 to 2017 he filmed two series of Tribes, Predators and Me. During these six episodes he spent time with several groups of people who lived alongside dangerous animals, such as hyenas and crocodiles. He continued the series with ‘The Reindeer Family and Me’ which saw him follow a herd of Reindeer as they journeyed on their migration. He also filmed a six part series titled '‘Into the Wild’', in which he took six famous people to nature hotspots around the UK to get a glimpse of the local wildlife. 2018 saw Buchanan present ‘Animals with Cameras’ in which he used new camera techniques to get a better insight into their lives. Following this, he filmed ‘Grizzly Bear Cubs and Me’, where he helps to rehabilitate young bears in order to help them return to the wild.

2019 saw Buchanan continuing to present nature programmes on the BBC. He travelled around the equator to present the series ‘Equator from the Air. He also filmed and presented ‘Snow Cats and Me’ in which he helped rehabilitate Lynx so that they could return to the wild. 2020 saw him return to Springwatch once again as a guest presenter, filming live from his native Scotland. He ended the with yet another ‘…And Me’ series, this time following Cheetahs in the wild in Africa.

In 2021, it was announced that he would front a second series of Animals with Cameras.

In November 2021, it was confirmed that Buchanan would tour the UK (30 Years in the Wild) in February 2022. 

In April 2022, the first two episodes of a long-running program Our Changing Planet premiered on the BBC, presented by Buchanan along with Liz Bonnin, Ella Al-Shamahi, Chris Packham, Ade Adepitan and Steve Backshall.

Awards

In June 2013 Buchanan was granted an honorary doctorate by the University of Stirling. He also won the Glenfiddich Spirit of Scotland award in the environment category in the same year, cementing his position as one of Scotland's finest cameramen and reputation as a renowned film maker.

Buchanan was appointed Member of the Order of the British Empire (MBE) in the 2020 New Year Honours for services to conservation and wildlife film-making.

Personal life

Buchanan frequently mentions missing his family at various points within his shows. The Bear Family & Me includes a segment in which his wife (Wendy) and their two children (Lola and Harris) visit him. He also has an interest in whisky.

Documentaries
 Wild Scotland (2002)
 Expedition Borneo (2006)
 Amba the Russian Tiger (2008)
 Lost Land of the Jaguar (2008)
 Lost Land of the Volcano (2009)
 Snow Watch (2010)
 Lost Land of the Tiger (2011)
 The Bear Family & Me (2011)
 Maneater Manhunt (2012)
 Land of the Lost Wolves (2012)
 The Polar Bear Family & Me (2013)
 Snow Wolf Family & Me (2014)
 Gorilla Family & Me (2015)
 Leopard in the City (2015)
 Elephant Family & Me (2016)
 Into the Wild (2016)
 Life in the Snow (2016)
 Life in Polar Bear Town (2016)
 Tribes, Predators & Me (2016–2017)
 The Reindeer Family & Me (2017)
 Animals with Cameras (Series 1) (2018)
 Grizzly Bear Cubs and Me (2018)
 Equator from the Air (2019)
 Snow Cats and Me (2019)
 The Cheetah Family and Me (2020)
 Animals with Cameras (Series 2) (2021)
 Our Wild Adventures (2021)
 Our Changing Planet (2022)
 Snow Dogs: Into The Wild (2022)

References

External links
Gordon Buchanan on Eden
Gordon Buchanan on IMDB
Gordon Buchanan on location with the BBC

Living people
Scottish television presenters
People from the Isle of Mull
1972 births
Members of the Order of the British Empire
People from West Dunbartonshire